Step by Step is the seventh studio album by American country music artist Eddie Rabbitt. It was originally released in 1981 under the Elektra Records label but the rights to the album were later sold to Liberty Records. The album continued the crossover success established in the singer's two previous albums. Three singles were produced including the "title track", which went to number one on country charts and reached the top 5 on both the Adult Contemporary and Billboard 100 charts. "Someone Could Lose a Heart Tonight" also reached number one on country charts and made the top 15 on the other two. "I Don't Know Where to Start" peaked at two and nine on the country and adult contemporary charts, respectively.

Like Horizon, Step by Step reached number one on country album charts and ultimately achieved gold status. Allmusic retrospectively gave the album 4.5 out of 5 stars.

Track listing

Chart performance

Album

Singles

Personnel
Eddie Rabbitt - lead and background vocals, acoustic guitar
Billy Joe Walker Jr., Larry Byrom - electric guitar
David Hungate, Don Barrett - bass guitar
Randy McCormick - keyboards, synthesizer, string arrangements
James Stroud - drums, percussion

References

1981 albums
Eddie Rabbitt albums
Elektra Records albums
Liberty Records albums